Gabriela Piedade Martins (born December 12, 1996), better known as Gabi Martins, is a Brazilian singer and songwriter.

Career 
In 2018 she recorded her first album, self-titled, which contains her greatest success "Neném".

In 2020 she participated in the reality show Big Brother Brasil 20, as a celebrity, being the eleventh evicted of the program with 59,61% of votes against Thelma Assis (36,28%) and Babu Santana (4,11%).

Singles

Filmography

Awards and nominations

References 

1996 births
Living people
People from Belo Horizonte
Brazilian women composers
21st-century Brazilian singers
21st-century Brazilian women singers
Big Brother Brasil
Big Brother (franchise) contestants